The 1929 Arthur's Pass earthquake occurred at  on 9 March. The sparsely settled region around Arthur's Pass of the Southern Alps shook for four minutes. Tremors continued almost continuously until midnight and sporadic strong aftershocks were felt for several days.

The earthquake was measured at 7.1 on the Richter magnitude scale and the intensity of shaking in the epicentral region has been assessed from historical records as VIII (Severe) on the Modified Mercalli Scale. Intensities of VI (Strong) were observed in Christchurch and Westport. The earthquake occurred on the Poulter Fault, which was not identified and mapped until 2001.

Tectonic setting
New Zealand lies along the boundary between the Australian and Pacific plates. In the South Island most of the relative displacement between these plates is taken up along a single dextral (right lateral) strike-slip fault with a major reverse component, the Alpine Fault. In the North Island the displacement is mainly taken up along the Kermadec-Tonga subduction zone, although the remaining dextral strike-slip component is accommodated by the North Island Fault System. The Poulter Fault runs for approximately 50 km Northeast from the junction of the Bealey and Mahinga rivers to the valley of the Hurunui River. Between 16 km and 36 km of the fault ruptured, with dextral displacement of up to 4 metres and dip-slip displacement of 1–2 metres (North side up).

Effects
Numerous landslides were triggered, damaging the Midland Railway and blocking roads. The highway connecting Canterbury and the West Coast via Arthur's Pass was closed for several months. Many water tanks and chimneys were damaged or toppled. Two years after the earthquake, trampers in the Otahake Valley discovered that a 900m high section of the side of a mountain had collapsed, blocking the valley and sending debris 5 km downstream.

Although this is one of the ten largest land-based earthquakes to strike New Zealand since European settlement, it was overshadowed by the more deadly 1929 Murchison earthquake a few months later.

See also
List of earthquakes in 1929
List of earthquakes in New Zealand

References

External links
 Photograph of Falling Mountain landslip – Te Ara Encyclopedia of New Zealand
 

1929 Arthur's Pass
Arthurs Pass Earthquake, 1929
New Zealand – Arthur's Pass
History of Canterbury, New Zealand